The Governor Henry Lippitt House is a historic house museum at 199 Hope Street on the East Side of Providence, Rhode Island.  A National Historic Landmark, it is one of the finest Italianate mansion houses in the state, and considered one of the best-preserved examples of Victorian-era houses in the US. It is notable for its association with Henry Lippitt (1818–91), a wealthy textile magnate who was the 33rd Governor of Rhode Island.  The house is owned by Preserve Rhode Island, and is open to the public for tours seasonally or by appointment.

Description
The Lippitt House is a large three-story brick structure, resting on a brownstone foundation, and topped by a roof that is hipped except for a projecting gable at the front (western) elevation.  A two-story wing projects to the rear (east) of the house.  The corners of the building are quoined in brownstone, and there are brownstone belt courses between the first and second floors.  The main entry is sheltered by a semicircular porch supported by fluted and cabled Corinthian columns.  The porch has an elaborately decorated roof line, as does the main roof and the porte cochere on the north side.

The interior is in a remarkable state of preservation. The public rooms in particular exhibit a wide variety of materials and are richly decorated with wallpaper, woodwork, plasterwork, and stenciling. Original gas lighting fixtures are still present, but have been converted to electricity. Stained glass windows adorn the stair landings.

The house is the finest of a group of mansion houses built along Hope Street by wealthy Providence businessmen and politicians, which are now a part of the Hope-Power-Cooke Streets Historic District.

History

The house was built in 1865 by Governor Henry Lippitt and was loosely based upon a design by Russell Warren. Lippitt descendants lived in the house until the 1970s.

The house was listed on the National Register of Historic Places in 1972, and designated a National Historic Landmark in 1976. In 1981, the Lippitt family donated it to Preserve Rhode Island, which maintains the house as a Victorian period historic house museum.

150th anniversary
To commemorate the 150th anniversary of Lippitt House, the museum held a series of exhibits and events in 2015. The first of these was an outdoor exhibit of six brushed aluminum sculptures by artist Aaron Pexa. The sculptures, viewable on the front lawn of the mansion, were colorful silhouettes which represent domestic workers who worked for Henry Lippitt.

Gallery

See also

List of National Historic Landmarks in Rhode Island
National Register of Historic Places listings in Providence, Rhode Island

References

External links
Lippitt House from Preserve Rhode Island
Photos

National Historic Landmarks in Rhode Island
Houses on the National Register of Historic Places in Rhode Island
Houses completed in 1865
Historic house museums in Rhode Island
Museums in Providence, Rhode Island
Houses in Providence, Rhode Island
Historic American Buildings Survey in Rhode Island
Lippitt family
National Register of Historic Places in Providence, Rhode Island
Historic district contributing properties in Rhode Island
Italianate architecture in Rhode Island
Governor of Rhode Island